1836 in archaeology.

Explorations
 October 16 - Ruins of Roman site at Mastaura in Greece visited by William Hamilton.
 Site of Susa in Persia examined by Henry Rawlinson.

Excavations

Finds
 May - Right half of Llandaf Diptych (carved from elephant ivory in Paris around 1340/60) found in south Wales.
 June
 17 miniature coffins of unknown provenance are found in a cave on Arthur's Seat in Edinburgh.
 Wreck of Tudor navy ship Mary Rose (capsized 1545) discovered in the Solent.
 Chatsworth Head found near Tamassos on Cyprus.

Publications
 Otto Jahn - Palamedes.
 Christian Jürgensen Thomsen - Ledetraad til Nordisk Oldkyndighed.

Events
 October 25 - Luxor Obelisk re-erected in Place de la Concorde, Paris.
 James Prinsep begins to decipher the Edicts of Ashoka.

Births

Deaths

References

Archaeology
Archaeology by year
Archaeology
Archaeology